Carpenter Township is a township in Itasca County, Minnesota, United States. The population was 179 at the 2010 census.

Carpenter Township was named for Seth Carpenter, an early settler.

State Highways 1 (MN 1) and 65 (MN 65) are two of the main routes in the township. The unincorporated community of Togo is located within Carpenter Township.

Geography

A majority of the township is located within the George Washington State Forest of Itasca County.

The community of Togo, within Carpenter Township, is located 32 miles north of Nashwauk.  Togo is also located 25 miles west of Cook; and 25 miles east of Effie.

Demographics
As of the census of 2000, there were 208 people, 99 households, and 65 families residing in the township.  The population density was 2.1 people per square mile (0.8/km2).  There were 266 housing units at an average density of 2.6/sq mi (1.0/km2).  The racial makeup of the township was 97.12% White, 1.92% Native American, and 0.96% from two or more races.

There were 99 households, out of which 9.1% had children under the age of 18 living with them, 61.6% were married couples living together, 2.0% had a female householder with no husband present, and 34.3% were non-families. 29.3% of all households were made up of individuals, and 16.2% had someone living alone who was 65 years of age or older.  The average household size was 1.98 and the average family size was 2.38.

In the township the population was spread out, with 15.9% under the age of 18, 2.4% from 18 to 24, 22.6% from 25 to 44, 31.3% from 45 to 64, and 27.9% who were 65 years of age or older.  The median age was 52 years. For every 100 females, there were 103.9 males.  For every 100 females age 18 and over, there were 124.4 males.

The median income for a household in the township was $30,000, and the median income for a family was $32,917. Males had a median income of $30,536 versus $22,813 for females. The per capita income for the township was $17,860.  About 3.8% of families and 11.6% of the population were below the poverty line, including none of those under the age of eighteen and 3.5% of those 65 or over.

References

Townships in Itasca County, Minnesota
Townships in Minnesota